Viraat (meaning giant in Sanskrit) is a 2016 Indian film. Viraat may also refer to:

INS Viraat, a former Indian aircraft carrier
Viraat Badhwar (born 1995), Indian-Australian golfer 
Viraat Ramayan Mandir, a Hindu temple complex in Kesaria, India
Operation Viraat, a 1988 anti-insurgency operation in Sri Lanka

See also
Virat (disambiguation)
Virata (disambiguation)